The diocese of Bac Ninh is a Roman Catholic diocese of Vietnam. The bishop position is vacant since June 2006.

The creation of the diocese in present form was declared November 24, 1960.

The diocese covers an area of 12,227 km², and is a suffragan diocese of the Archdiocese of Hanoi.

By 2004, the diocese of Bac Ninh had about 123,090 believers (1.8% of the population), 23 priests and 47 parishes.

Queen of the Rosary Cathedral in Bac Ninh has been assigned as the Cathedral of the diocese.

References

Christian organizations established in 1960
Bac Ninh
Roman Catholic dioceses and prelatures established in the 20th century
Bac Ninh, Roman Catholic Diocese of
1960 establishments in North Vietnam
Bắc Ninh province